Erastriopis is a genus of moths of the family Erebidae. The genus was erected by George Hampson in 1926.

Species
Erastriopis anaemica Hampson, 1926
Erastriopis atrirena de Joannis, 1929
Erastriopis costiplaga Rothschild, 1916
Erastriopis lativitta Moore, 1883

References

Calpinae